The Viișoara is a left tributary of the river Prahova in Romania. It discharges into the Prahova near Palanca. It flows through the villages Târgșoru Nou, Târgșoru Vechi, Puchenii Mici and Puchenii Mari.

References

Rivers of Romania
Rivers of Prahova County